Arild Otto Arnardo (January 16, 1942 – November 16, 2020) was a Norwegian circus director. He was the son of the circus director Arne Arnardo. After his father's death in 1995, he became the director of Norway's oldest circus, Cirkus Arnardo. In his younger days, he also performed as a tightrope walker.

Career
On tours around Norway during the summer, Arild Arnardo brought with him his wife Bjørg Helene, his daughter the "circus princess" Helen, and his son Are. In 1991, the Arnardo family moved to the municipality of Lillesand. In the 1990s, Arild Arnardo had plans to establish a Cirkusland (Circus Land) located in Lillesand. The project was shelved in 1997.

In 2015, Arnardo and his wife Bjørg were awarded the King's Medal of Merit.

Filmography
1973: To fluer i ett smekk as the trainer
2008: Cirkusliv (TV series) as himself (circus director)
2012: Lindmo (TV series) as himself (guest)

References

External links
 

1942 births
2020 deaths
Norwegian circus performers
Circus owners
Recipients of the King's Medal of Merit in silver